Lega is the surname of:

 Achille Lega (1899–1934), Italian painter
 David Lega (born 1973), Swedish politician and paralympic swimmer
 Giulio Lega (1892–1973), Italian World War I flying ace
 Joceline Lega, French applied mathematician
 Mario Lega (born 1949), Italian motorcyclist
 Mario Lega (athlete) (born 1957), Italian long jumoer
 Michele Lega (1860–1935), cardinal
 Silvestro Lega (1826–1895), Italian painter
 Silvio Lega (1945–2021), Italian politician

See also
 Lega (disambiguation)